Steve Hesford is a former professional rugby league footballer who played for Warrington and Huddersfield.

Hesford holds the club record at Warrington for most goals scored (1,112). He was also the club record point scorer before he was passed by Lee Briers in 2011.

Hesford is the son of Bob Hesford, a former professional footballer who played as a goalkeeper. His two brothers also played sport; Iain Hesford was also a professional goalkeeper, while Robert "Bob" Hesford is a former rugby union international. Steve Hesford himself played 34 games as a goalkeeper for Northern Premier League club Fleetwood F.C. in 1973 before focussing on initially rugby union with Fleetwood RUFC and then professional rugby league.

Playing career

County Cup Final appearances
Steve Hesford played , i.e. number 5, and scored a try and 7-conversions in Warrington's 26-10 victory over Wigan in the 1980 Lancashire County Cup Final during the 1980–81 season at Knowsley Road, St. Helens, on Saturday 4 October 1980, played , scored 2-conversions, and was man of the match in the 16-0 victory over St. Helens in the 1982 Lancashire County Cup Final during the 1982–83 season at Central Park, Wigan on Saturday 23 October 1982.

Player's No.6/John Player Special Trophy Final appearances
Steve Hesford played , i.e. number 5, scored 3-conversions and was man of the match in Warrington's 9-4 victory over Widnes in the 1977–78 Players No.6 Trophy Final during the 1977–78 season at Knowsley Road, St. Helens on Saturday 28 January 1978, played right-, i.e. number 3, and scored 2-conversions in the 4-16 defeat by Widnes in the 1978–79 John Player Trophy Final during the 1978–79 season at Knowsley Road, St. Helens on Saturday 28 April 1979, and played , and scored 2-conversions and 2-drop goals in the 12-5 victory over Barrow in the 1980–81 John Player Trophy Final during the 1980–81 season at Central Park, Wigan on Saturday 24 January 1981.

Notable tour matches
Steve Hesford played right-, i.e. number 3, in Warrington's 15-12 victory over Australia at Wilderspool Stadium, Warrington on Wednesday 11 October 1978.

References

1954 births
Living people
Huddersfield Giants players
Lancashire rugby league team players
Rugby league fullbacks
Warrington Wolves players
Zimbabwean rugby league players